Jonathan Olivares (born 1981) is an American industrial designer and author. Olivares's approach to design has been characterized research-based and incremental. In April 2022 he became Senior Vice-President of Design at the Knoll furniture company.

Early life and education 
Olivares grew up in the metropolitan Boston area, and skateboarded as a teenager. He attended Boston College and The New School, before graduating with a Bachelor of Industrial Design (B.I.D.) from Pratt Institute in 2004. While a student, Olivares interned at Maison Margiela in Paris, where he worked on objects and interior, In 2005 he apprenticed for the industrial designer Konstantin Grcic in Munich. In 2006 Olivares began practicing industrial design independently, and his first office was in his mother's garage in Boston. His design practice is now based in Los Angeles.

Designs 
In 2007 Olivares designed a multi-purpose cart called Smith for Danese Milano. The form of the design is the result of a "balanced ecology" between multiple features; a container, a side-table or seat surface, handles, wheels, and a geometry that allows stacking. The design "contains multitudes designed deliberately, a framework of potential" and requires its user to see "capacity instead of categories, in which a table could also be a seat, perhaps, if you chose to sit on it." Made of sheet metal, "its versatility cohabits with its simplicity of construction and the environmental friendliness that comes from using a single material."

Between 2009 and 2012, Olivares developed the Aluminum Chair for Knoll, a technically advanced, stacking outdoor chair made of a die cast aluminum seat shell and extruded aluminum legs. The chair's seat shell is 3mm thick at its thinnest, “looks soft, despite its metallic nature,” and its “gracefully contoured form is slim, making it shaped for comfort.”

In 2015 Olivares designed the Aluminum Bench for Zahner, a customizable bench system made from architectural aluminum extrusions, that are “normally rolled to create the underlying frameworks for curvaceous architectural claddings.” The "extrusions are the bench's principle structural element, connecting its seating surface to its vertical cast legs," and "as the extrusions can be formed to any contour" the bench can be "made in relation to specific architectural contexts." In 2017 the Aluminum Bench was included in the Super Benches installation outside of Stockholm, curated by Felix Burrichter of Pin-Up Magazine.

The Twill Weave Daybed, commissioned from Olivares by the Harvard Graduate School of Design for 9 Ash Street, was realized in 2017 with the support of Kvadrat. The daybed is “predominately made of woven textile,” and “the narrow carbon fiber legs and cross beams, are manufactured using mast-making mandrels.” The daybed is strong enough to support the weight of a car, “but its mass is formed from material that is, for all intents and purposes, a textile.” The carbon fiber structure and a wool cushion that is died the color of graphite, are both twill weaves. This combination of materials results in a design that is simultaneously visually homogenous and celebrates the different materials used to make it.

Olivares designed a retail store for the Mallorcan shoe brand Camper at Rockefeller Center in Manhattan in 2019. The store furniture is milled from Indiana limestone, which was a nod to the building's iconic facade made of the same material, and the stockroom is replaced by archival sliding storage racks which sit in the open shop.

Reception 
His work has been described as “spare and formally rigorous, often concerned with high-tech manufacturing processes,” and as carrying a “signature elegance and simplicity.”

Design critic Alice Rawsthorn, writing in the International Herald Tribune about Olivares' book A Taxonomy of Office Chairs in 2011 observed: "You'll never look at an office chair in quite the same way again."

Grants and Awards 

 Graham Foundation, Research Grant, 2010
 Compasso d’Oro, 2011
 Graham Foundation, Exhibition Grant, 2011
 GOOD Design Award, 2012
Metropolis Likes Award, 2012

Collections 
Olivares's work is held in the following museum collections:

 Art Institute of Chicago, Chicago
 Los Angeles County Museum of Art, Los Angeles
 Vitra Design Museum, Weil am Rhein

Publications 

 Olivares, Jonathan. A Taxonomy of Office Chairs. London: Phaidon Press, 2011. 
 Morrison, J., Olivares, J., Velardi, M. Source Material. Weil am Rhein: Vitra Design Museum, 2015 
 Olivares, Jonathan. Richard Sapper. London: Phaidon Press, 2016. 
 Olivares, Jonathan. Jonathan Olivares Selected Works. New York: PowerHouse Books, 2017. 
 A Life in Chairs with Industrial Designer Don Chadwick. Interview Magazine, 2018 
 Olivares, Jonathan. Don Chadwick Photography 1961-2005. Barcelona: Apartamento Press, 2019. 
 Georgacopoulos, A., Olivares, J. The ECAL Manual of Style: How to best teach design today? London: Phaidon Press, 2022.

External links 
 Jonathan Olivares website
 Jonathan Olivares’ working environment (Vitra)
 Pin-Up Magazine review of the designer's book Selected Works
 Rouse Visiting Artist Lecture, Harvard Graduate School of Design, September 15, 2015
 Industrial Designers Society of America (ISDA) Biography

References 

1981 births
Living people
Pratt Institute alumni
Industrial designers
Industrial design
American furniture designers
American designers
Designers
Compasso d'Oro Award recipients